Herlinda iota is a moth in the family Cosmopterigidae. It was described by John Frederick Gates Clarke in 1986. It is found on the Marquesas Islands in French Polynesia.

References

Cosmopterigidae
Moths described in 1986